Hippopsis prona is a species of beetle in the family Cerambycidae. It was described by Bates in 1866.

References

Hippopsis
Beetles described in 1866